Walter McQueen Stephenson (March 27, 1911 in Saluda, North Carolina – July 4, 1993 in Shreveport, Louisiana), nicknamed "Tarzen", was a professional baseball player who played catcher in the Major Leagues from 1935 to 1937. He played for the Chicago Cubs and Philadelphia Phillies.

External links

1911 births
1993 deaths
Major League Baseball catchers
Chicago Cubs players
Philadelphia Phillies players
High Point Pointers players
Knoxville Smokies players
Lafayette White Sox players
Los Angeles Angels (minor league) players
Montreal Royals players
Mount Airy Graniteers players
Oklahoma City Indians players
Shreveport Sports players
Winston-Salem Twins players
Baseball players from North Carolina
People from Saluda, North Carolina